The women's 59 kilograms competition at the 2022 World Weightlifting Championships was held on 7 and 8 December 2022.

Schedule

Medalists

Records

Results

References

Women's 59 kg
World Championships